Dennis Franklin Partee (born September 2, 1946) is a former American football kicker and punter who played professionally for the San Diego Chargers in the American Football League and later in the National Football League. In 1975, he co-founded the coin-operated video game manufacturer Cinematronics with teammate Gary Garrison.

1946 births
Living people
People from Cameron, Texas
Players of American football from Texas
American football placekickers
American football punters
SMU Mustangs football players
San Diego Chargers players
American Football League players